Athena Starwoman (17 July 1945 – 16 December 2004), also known internationally as Miss Starwoman.

She was known as a media astrologer, as well as for her magazine columns and books, her radio and television appearance's and had a phone and online astrology business

Born in Prahran, Victoria, to a housewife mother and father who was an engineer, her grandmother had been a physic and mystic. After studying astrology in Los Angeles in the 1970s, she returned to Australia and wrote for The Daily Telegraph newspaper from 1978 and 1988, and also had a regular column in Woman's Day magazine

During her final years, she divided her time between a luxury apartment at Broadbeach on the Gold Coast in Queensland and a US$3,000,000 apartment on the cruise liner The World, which she purchased after selling an apartment in New York's Trump Tower. She was married to self help guru Dr. John Demartini. Starwoman died on 16 December 2004 from breast cancer.

Publications (selected)

References

Further reading 

 
 
 

1945 births
2004 deaths
20th-century astrologers
21st-century astrologers
American columnists
American women columnists
Australian astrologers
Australian columnists
Australian women columnists
Deaths from breast cancer
People from Melbourne
Writers from New York (state)
20th-century American journalists